Mont Terri (804 m) is one of the mountains of the Jura Mountains range. It is located south of Cornol in the Canton of Jura. The mountain can be located 140 km west of Zurich.

A prehistoric site, Mont-Terri Castle, is located on the summit.

Geological structure
The Mont Terri has an anticline structure and is the northernmost anticline of the folded Jura. The sedimentary rock layers of Jurassic age dip 42° into the direction of SSE. The Mont Terri anticline hosts different tunnel infrastructures.

A limestone underground quarry was first exploited by room and pillar mining for the "Fabrique de chaux" of Saint Ursanne until the 1980s. The Mont Terri tunnel (4 068 m length) was excavated and constructed between 1988 and 1998 for the Transjuranne A16 motorway. It consists of one single main tube hosting two circulation ways in opposite direction and one security gallery for emergency interventions and escape route in case of fire. The security gallery of smaller diameter was first excavated and served as reconnaissance gallery (pilot gallery) during the construction works.

With the Mont Russelin tunnel, it makes possible to cross the last chain of the folded Jura (Les Rangiers) from the Swiss plateau to reach the Ajoie region. The Mont Terri tunnel directly connects the near localities of Saint Ursanne (SSE) and Courgenay (NNW) and the cities of Delémont and Porrentruy.

In 1995, it was decided to construct the Mont Terri Rock Laboratory from the security gallery. It started with the excavation of small niches in the security gallery in 1996. The Mont Terri Rock Laboratory was then further extended in different excavation phases every 10 years: gallery 1998, gallery 2008, and finally gallery 2018.

Underground Research Rock Laboratory 
The mountain is the site of an international research project, the Mont Terri Project, founded in 1996. The facilities consist of the underground  conducting research on geological, hydrogeological, geochemical and geotechnical characterisation of Opalinus Clay, a thick and watertight argillaceous claystone.

The research team includes 22 partners from Switzerland, Europe, Japan, Canada, and USA, also associated with different research organizations in their respective countries. The purpose of the studies is to characterize the properties of this deep clay formation, to develop new methods and to test on site characterization techniques to understand thermal, hydraulical, mechanical (THM) and biochemical processes important for warranting the long-term safety of the geological disposal of highly radioactive waste (HLW) and spent nuclear fuel (SF).

In the recent years, the scope of the researches conducted at the Mont Terri Rock Laboratory has been widen to also include other scientific activities dealing with the deep underground such as seismology, carbon capture and storage (CCS), and the deep geothermy.

By convention with the Republic and Canton of Jura, it is excluded to use the Mont Terri site to dispose radioactive waste. The project aims to share information and knowledge between Mont Terri partners and to prepare the deep geological disposal in Opalinus Clay at greater depth (-600 to -700 m) in the north of Switzerland in the area of Zurich in the decades to come.

See also
 Damassine (local liqueur)
 Grimsel Pass, and the Grimsel Test Site (GTS, Rock Laboratory in granite)
 Grimsel Tunnel
 
 A16 motorway (Switzerland) (Transjuranne way)
 Saint-Ursanne

References

Further reading

External links
 
 Mont Terri on Hikr

Mountains of the Jura
Mountains of the canton of Jura
Mountains of Switzerland
Mountains of Switzerland under 1000 metres
Underground laboratories
Tunnels completed in the 1990s